Howard Devree (May 7, 1890 – February 9, 1966) was an American editor and art critic. He joined The New York Times in 1926, where he was an editor and, from 1947 to 1959, its art critic. He resided at 5 Gramercy Park.

References

1890 births
1966 deaths
People from Gramercy Park
American editors
American art critics
The New York Times editors
20th-century American newspaper editors